BBC Radio nan Gàidheal is a Scottish Gaelic language radio station owned and operated by BBC Scotland, a division of the BBC. The station was launched in 1985 and broadcasts Gaelic-language programming with the simulcast of BBC Radio Scotland.

The station is available from FM transmitters throughout Scotland: its service licence states that "BBC Radio nan Gàidheal should be available every day for general reception across Scotland on FM"; it can also be heard on digital television platforms, DAB Digital Radio, and online.

BBC Radio nan Gàidheal programmes are also broadcast (with an in-vision graphical overlay) on the Scottish Gaelic digital television channel BBC Alba during periods when the channel is not carrying television programmes.

History 

Scottish Gaelic-language programming has been transmitted in Scotland since 1923, and the BBC's Gaelic-language department was established in 1935. Launching on 17 May 1976, BBC Radio Highland produced a range of Gaelic programming –  – and on 5 October 1979 the Scottish Gaelic service  was established in Stornoway. On 1 October 1985, these two separate services united to form . The main base for BBC Radio nan Gàidheal is on Seaforth Road in Stornoway, having moved in June 2014 from the Church Street studios.

Coverage 
Radio nan Gàidheal broadcasts for over 90 hours every week, and joins BBC Radio Scotland's medium-wave feed when they close transmission.   now frequently broadcasts important Scottish football matches providing Gaelic commentary.

Radio nan Gàidheal shows are available for 30 days after most recent broadcast on BBC iPlayer and on the BBC's website.

Podcasts of some shows are available from the BBC website and on iTunes for some time after transmission. These include two programmes aimed at learners of the language, entitled Letter to Gaelic Learners and The Little Letter, the latter being a more basic version of the former. Both letters are also available at learngaelic.net, with transcripts.

Funding 
The service budget for 2009 was £3.9m with a change of any more than 10% requiring approval of the BBC Trust. The service budget in 2011 was almost the same as 2009 at £3.8m and requires the same controls as previous licences. This funding comes from the BBC Trust, the governing body of the BBC which is operationally independent of management and external bodies. As is the same with all BBC Radio and TV stations, the channel is funded by the licence fees gathered.

Programming

News and talk programmes

News
The news is broadcast in three-minute bulletins on the hour every hour between 8am and 4pm during the week and three times a day on the weekend.

Shows containing other local and national news include:
Aithris na Maidne – The main morning news and current affairs programme of Radio nan Gàidheal. Presented by Seumas Dòmhnallach and Dòmhnall Moireasdan from 7:30am - 9am. It covers a wide news agenda, encompassing national and international affairs, Highland and Island issues and issues pertaining specifically to the Gàidhealtachd.
Aithris an Fheasgair – Local and national news from 5pm - 5:30pm.

Current affairs and Drivetime
Naoi gu Deich – Daily topical programme with conversation, discussion, culture and lifestyle. Presented by Cathy MacDonald (Mon - Thur) and Maureen MacLeod (Fri).
Feasgar – Lunchtime show including news, debate, music and entertainment, presented by Niall Iain MacDonald & Emma Lamont.
Siubhal gu Seachd le Pluto – Drive time show containing music, entertainment and the latest sports news with Derek 'Pluto' Murray.

Music programmes
A' Mire ri Mòir – Presented by Mòrag Dhòmhnallach (MacDonald). Traditional Gaelic music and general chat every weekday from BBC studio in Inverness.
Caithream Ciùil – Daily afternoon programme featuring Celtic music and interviews presented by Mairead MacLennan and Seonag Monk.
Fàilte air an Dùthaich (Welcome to the country) – Country music from the Ness to Nashville presented in 10 week alternating blocks by Marie Matheson and Anne Sinclair.
Mac'illeMhìcheil – Weekly Gaelic and country music show presented by Iain Mac'illeMhìcheil (John Carmichael), with his guests from the Glasgow studio.
Na Dùrachdan – Music request show where listeners can request songs by telephone, internet and email. Presented from Inverness.
Rapal – show dedicated to new music including rock, pop and indie, currently presented by Megan MacLellan every Tuesday between 7pm - 9pm.
Mo Chuairt Chiùil – A look at the songs and music that has influenced this week's guest.

Other programmes

SpeakGaelic – Educational programme for Gaelic learners, presented by Joy Dunlop, John Urquhart and Calum MacLean.
Dèanamaid Adhradh – Weekly religious programme.
Spòrs na Seachdain (Week's Sport) – Weekly sports programme. It broadcasts local, national and international sporting news with John Morrison. It is presented from Pacific Quay in Glasgow. Guests often include  Derek Murray, former Eòrpa reporter and spòrs commentator Derek Mackay and Ailig O'Henley.

See also 
List of Celtic-language media
RTÉ Raidió na Gaeltachta – An Irish sister station.
BBC Alba – The BBC's Gaelic television channel.

References

External links 

1985 establishments in Scotland
BBC regional radio stations
BBC Scotland
Indigenous radio
Radio stations established in 1985
Radio stations in Scotland
Scottish Gaelic mass media
Stornoway